Delbert "Del" Tenney (July 27, 1930 – February 21, 2013) was an American actor, film director, screenwriter and film producer. Starting out as an actor he appeared in some Off-Broadway plays and also performed in the Broadway premiere of Terence Rattigan's play Ross. He then established a legacy in film with several low-budget horror/exploitation films in the 1960s, including The Horror of Party Beach (1964). Based in Connecticut, Tenney's other films include Psychomania (a.k.a. Violent Midnight), The Curse of the Living Corpse, and  I Eat Your Skin.

Tenney died on February 21, 2013, at his home in Jupiter, Florida. He was 82.

Tenney married stage and film actress Margot Hartman. They remained married until his death.

Filmography

References

External links
 
 
 
 

1930 births
2013 deaths
American male film actors
American film directors
American film producers
American male screenwriters
20th-century American male actors
20th-century American screenwriters
20th-century American male writers
American male stage actors